Selbak Turn & Idrettsforening is a Norwegian association football club from Sellebakk, Fredrikstad, Østfold.

It was founded on 20 April 1919. The club colors are green and white.

The men's football team currently plays in the Third Division, the fourth tier of Norwegian football. It last played in the Norwegian Second Division in 1997.

References

 Official site 

Football clubs in Norway
Sport in Fredrikstad
Association football clubs established in 1919
1919 establishments in Norway